Lukáš Špelda (born 6 January 1985) is a Czech professional ice hockey defenceman.

Špelda played a total of 121 games in the Czech Extraliga for HC Slavia Praha. He also for HC Kometa Brno and HC Havlíčkův Brod as well in the Ligue Magnus for Aigles de Nice.

References

External links

1985 births
Living people
Les Aigles de Nice players
HC Berounští Medvědi players
Czech ice hockey defencemen
BK Havlíčkův Brod players
SHK Hodonín players
HC Kometa Brno players
People from Mělník
HC Most players
HC Slavia Praha players
HC Slovan Ústečtí Lvi players
Sportovní Klub Kadaň players
HC Stadion Litoměřice players
Sportspeople from the Central Bohemian Region
Czech expatriate ice hockey people
Czech expatriate sportspeople in France
Expatriate ice hockey players in France